The 2013 NAIA Division II Men’s Basketball national championship was held in March at Keeter Gymnasium in Point Lookout, Missouri.  The 22nd annual NAIA basketball tournament featured thirty-two teams playing in a single-elimination format. The championship game was won by Cardinal Stritch University over William Penn University by a score of 73 to 59.

Tournament field
The 2013 tournament field was announced on March 5. The field was made up of 23 automatic qualifiers and eight at-large bids and one automatic host bid presented to College of the Ozarks. This tournament field welcomed four newcomers, Madonna (Michigan), Rochester (Michigan), Saint Xavier (Illinois) and Valley City State (North Dakota).

Highlights

First round

With five players scoring in double figures, including Roosevelt Green with eighteen, sixth seeded St. Xavier's dominated St. Mary's in first round action by a score of 82-60.

Second round

Elite Eight

Derek Semenas and Darren Moore both scored eighteen, and Moore pulled in eleven rebounds as second seed Cardinal Stritch defeated Dordt 82-76 in double overtime.

Fab Four

Championship game

Stritch won their first ever national championship 73-59 over William Penn on an impressive 21 point, seven rebound performance by Darren Moore.

Bracket

Tourney awards and honors
Dr. James Naismith/Emil Liston Team Sportsmanship Award: California State University-Maritime

Individual recognition
Most Outstanding Player: Darren Moore, Cardinal Stritch
Championship Hustle Award: Nick Ford, Cardinal Stritch
NABC/NAIA Division II Coach of the Year: Drew Diener, Cardinal Stritch
Rawlings-NAIA Division II National Coach of the Year: Drew Diener, Cardinal Stritch
2014 NAIA Division II Men’s Basketball All-Championship Team

Statistical leaders
(minimum 4 games)

See also
2013 NAIA Division I men's basketball tournament
2013 NCAA Division I men's basketball tournament
2013 NCAA Division II men's basketball tournament
2013 NCAA Division III men's basketball tournament
2013 NAIA Division II women's basketball tournament

References

NAIA Men's Basketball Championship
Tournament
2013 in sports in Missouri